Rupakot is a Village Development Committee (VDC) in Gulmi District in the Lumbini Zone of central Nepal. Its headquarters is in Myal pokhara. It is located in about the center of Gulmi District. It is surrounded by hills. Its main religion is Hinduism. There are many temples like Chhatra Thaan, Shiddababa temple, Shiva Temple, Ram Temple, Debi deurali temple etc. The main sources of revenue for the village are agriculture and foreign employment. At the time of the 2001 Nepal census, it had a population of 3521 persons residing in 704 individual households. 76.48% of students attend school. The most populated parts of this VDC is Damuka, Sota & Ekle Pipal.

References

Populated places in Gulmi District